The 2018 Viterra Championship, Manitoba's provincial men's curling championship, was held from January 31 to February 4 at the Winkler Centennial Arena in Winkler. The winning Reid Carruthers team represented Manitoba at the 2018 Tim Hortons Brier in Regina, Saskatchewan.

The semifinal and final games were broadcast on Sportsnet One.

Teams
Teams are as follows: 

*McEwen was hospitalized from the second draw until the semifinals due to having chicken pox. Except for the first draw and the final, the team played with just three players, with B. J. Neufeld assuming skipping duties. McEwen skipped and threw third stones in the final.

Draw
32 team double knockout with playoff round
Four teams qualify each from A Event and B Event

A Event

B Event

Playoffs

Playoff round
8 team double knockout
Four teams qualify into Championship Round

Championship round

1 vs. 2
Saturday, February 3, 6:00 pm

3 vs. 4
Saturday, February 3, 6:00 pm

Semifinal
Sunday, February 4, 8:30 am

Final
Sunday, February 4, 3:00 pm

References

2018 Tim Hortons Brier
Sport in Winkler, Manitoba
Curling in Manitoba
2018 in Manitoba
February 2018 sports events in Canada